Tusayan National Forest was established by the U.S. Forest Service in Arizona on July 1, 1910 with  from part of Coconino National Forest and other lands. On October 22, 1934 the entire forest was transferred to Kaibab National Forest and the name was discontinued.

See also

 Tusayan Ruins
 Tusayan, Arizona

References

External links
 Forest History Society
 Forest History Society:Listing of the National Forests of the United States Text from Davis, Richard C., ed. Encyclopedia of American Forest and Conservation History. New York: Macmillan Publishing Company for the Forest History Society, 1983. Vol. II, pp. 743-788.
   

Former National Forests of Arizona